The MAAC Defensive Rookie of the Year was an annual award given out at the conclusion of the Metro Atlantic Athletic Conference regular season to the best defensive men's ice hockey freshman in the conference as voted by the coaches of each MAAC team.

The award was discontinued after 2002-03 when the MAAC ice hockey conference was dissolved and all remaining programs reformed in Atlantic Hockey.

Award winners

Winners by school

Winners by position

See also
Atlantic Hockey Rookie of the Year
MAAC Awards

References 

College ice hockey trophies and awards in the United States